Behold a Pale Horse (a title quoting the Book of Revelation 6:8, "behold a pale horse [ridden by Death]") is a 1964 American drama film directed by Fred Zinnemann and starring Gregory Peck, Omar Sharif and Anthony Quinn. The film is based on the 1961 novel Killing a Mouse on Sunday by Emeric Pressburger, which loosely details the life of the Spanish anarchist guerrilla Francesc Sabaté Llopart.

Plot
The movie opens with shots from the Spanish Civil War, and a line of Spanish refugees crossing the border into France after defeat by the Francoists. Republican guerrilla fighter Manuel Artiguez (Gregory Peck) turns away from the border and back towards Spain. His friends stop him, saying "Manuel, the war is over!".

The story returns twenty years later, to a young boy named Paco (Carlo Angeletti), who asks a man named Pedro (Paolo Stoppa) why Artiguez, who is legendary for his fierce resistance to Franco even after the defeat of the Republicans, has stopped his guerrilla raids against the Francoists in Spain. Pedro sends Paco into France to find his uncle and Artiguez. Paco tells Artiguez that he wants him to kill Viñolas (Anthony Quinn), a Guardia Civil officer, for killing his father. Paco lets Artiguez know that his father was killed because he wouldn't tell the police where to find Artiguez, whom Viñolas must capture if he is to retain his rank in the Guard.

Meanwhile, Viñolas has learned that Artiguez's mother (Mildred Dunnock) is dying, and sets a trap at the hospital in San Martín to capture Artiguez, presuming that he will come to see his mother. Like all Republican sympathizers, she is contemptuous and deeply suspicious of all Catholic clergy, some of who collaborated with Francoist Spain, both during and after the war. In return for information about the layout of the hospital and surrounding area, Paco tells Artiguez to "bump into Viñolas" for him.

A priest (Omar Sharif) visits with Artiguez's mother, who initially refuses to speak to him, but his kindness and sincerity win her over enough to ask him to warn her son not to come to see her, as she knows the Guard will be waiting for him. After Viñolas has laid his trap, Artiguez's mother dies, but Viñolas sends a spy to convince Artiguez otherwise, and to come visit her. When the priest appears at Artiguez's house, he's gone, so the priest tells Paco to pass on the message that Artiguez's mother is already dead, and not to go to San Martín. The priest also gives Paco a letter to warn Artiguez that he saw a collaborator at the Guard headquarters.

Paco flushes the letter down the toilet and doesn't pass on the verbal message because he feels sure the priest must be lying. Afterwards, Paco recognizes the man (Carlos) in Artiguez's house as the informer, and tells Artiguez about the priest's message. Pedro believes the boy, but Artiguez can't believe his friend Carlos would betray him. Trying to clear up the mess, Artiguez takes Paco and Carlos to Lourdes to find the priest. But the priest was delayed on the way, and since he's not there, they let Carlos go. On the way back, however, they see the priest, and forcibly take him to Artiguez's house. When Carlos returns to Artiguez's house for his rucksack, Artiguez asks the priest to come out. Carlos, knowing he is exposed, attacks Artiguez and escapes.

The priest tries to overcome Artiguez's antipathy for all clergy and Artiguez confesses that he knew all along that his mother was sick but didn't visit her before her death because he is no longer as brave as he was in his youth. Embarrassed by admitting his vulnerability, Artiguez allows the priest to go free and, after much internal debate, he decides to go to San Martín anyway, presumably with the mission of killing Viñolas. Once in San Martín, Artiguez encounters a Francoist sniper on the roof of the hospital and attacks him, sending him to his death. Picking up the sniper's rifle he sees Carlos the informer (who is with the police in a nearby building) looking out a window to see what has caused the commotion ; Artiguez pauses briefly then shoots Carlos, killing him.  Once inside the hospital, he kills a few officers, but is finally shot.

Soldiers and officers congratulate Viñolas on at last killing his enemy, but he asks one of his lieutenants, knowing his mother was already dead and a trap would be waiting for him, why did Artiguez come back? The final shot is of the morgue, with the soldiers Artiguez killed and Artiguez himself (and his dead mother), wheeled in on gurneys and arranged in a row, dead.

Cast
 Gregory Peck as Manuel Artiguez, an aging Republican guerilla
 Anthony Quinn as Captain Viñolas, a Francoist Guardia Civil captain
 Omar Sharif as Francisco, a priest
 Raymond Pellegrin as Carlos, a friend of Artiguez, also his traitor
 Paolo Stoppa as Pedro
 Mildred Dunnock as Pilar Artiquez, the dying mother of Artiguez
 Christian Marquand as Zaganar
 Carlo Angeletti ("Marietto") as Paco
 Daniela Rocca as Rosanna
 Rosalie Crutchley as Teresa Viñolas
 Michael Lonsdale as Reporter

Production
Behold a Pale Horse was co-produced by Columbia Pictures, along with Zinnemann (Highland Productions) and Peck (Brentwood Productions). The production resorted to filming exterior shots across the border in France: Biarritz on la Côte Basque, and locations in Béarn such as Pau, Oloron, Gotein-Libarrenx, La Brèche de Roland, and the basilica at Lourdes, as well as Studio St. Maurice in Vincennes.

Originally, Anthony Quinn had requested the role of Artiguez, but Zinnemann felt it would be type-casting him, and gave him the opposing role of the villain Viñolas. As well, several Spanish refugees were used to play the parts of Franco's Guardia Civil officers. The American leftist political activist Allard K. Lowenstein played a part in making contact between the filmmakers and anti-Francoist Spanish exiles in France. Zinnemann felt it would be good for Peck to be able to meet actual political refugees living in France.

Filming began on June 13, 1963, and continued for a little over 100 days, running nearly a month over schedule. After Columbia previewed the film for US audiences, they decided that an intro was needed to provide background relating to the Spanish Civil War, so clips from the documentary about the war To Die in Madrid were interspersed with dialogue explaining the conflict.

Music and score

The score for Behold a Pale Horse was composed and conducted by Maurice Jarre. The instrumentation consists mainly of Spanish-style guitar, woodwind instruments, harpsichord, and the harp.

The score was originally released by Colpix Records as an LP (Colpix Records SCP 519) in the United States, and a two track EP in France. In April 2007 Film Score Monthly re-released the score on a CD (including the two unique tracks from the EP) accompanied by the score to Damn the Defiant (catalog number FSM1004).

The main theme from the score also featured on the CD Maurice Jarre at Abbey Road released in 1992 by Milan Records, with Jarre conducting the Royal Philharmonic Orchestra.

Reception and release history
Despite promotional tours by Peck (in the US) and Zinnemann (London and Paris), the film did not have a large reception (the box-office receipts not being enough even to recoup the costs of production). According to Zinnemann this was because the Spanish Civil War had slipped from the memories of its audience. The New York Times gave it a mixed review, being disappointed with the execution of the film, though impressed with its sets and actors, while Variety was generally impressed, calling it "among the better" of Peck's career.

Incensed by scenes showing Viñolas with a mistress, and taking bribes, the government of Spain denied filming as well as distribution in Spain, causing problems for its distributor, Columbia Pictures, which had all of its films denied distribution in Spain, and was compelled to sell its distribution arm in Spain. Columbia Pictures remained closed in Spain for several years, until agreeing to release several Spanish films outside of Spain. Months prior to the release of the film, Columbia Vice President M. J. Frankovich estimated that the studio had lost "millions" in the year since it had decided to go ahead with production against the wishes of the Spanish government.

According to Allmovie, the film was scheduled to be shown on national television in the United States, but was cancelled at the request of the Spanish government.

Often compared to the previous year's Lawrence of Arabia, as it has two of the same lead actors, Zinnemann countered the comparison with "I don't feel any obligation to be successful, success can be dangerous--you feel you know it all. I've learned a great deal from my failures."

One of the film's stars, Omar Sharif, referred to it as a "bad film" by a "good director".

Time magazine said about the film in its review: "Pale Horse is a white elephant."

See also

 1964 in film
 Assassinations in fiction
 List of American films of 1964
 List of war films and TV specials

References

External links 
 
 
 
 

1964 films
1960s war drama films
1960s political drama films
American political drama films
American war drama films
American black-and-white films
Columbia Pictures films
Films scored by Maurice Jarre
Films about anarchism
Films about Catholicism
Films based on British novels
Films based on military novels
Films directed by Fred Zinnemann
Films set in France
Films set in Spain
Spanish Civil War films
1960s Spanish-language films
1964 drama films
Censorship in Spain
Film controversies in Spain
Films about the Spanish Maquis
1960s English-language films
1960s American films